is a  former professional Japanese baseball player. He played pitcher for the Tokyo Yakult Swallows. He has been a batting practice pitcher for the Hanshin Tigers since 2018.

External links

 NPB.com

1986 births
Living people
Baseball people from Hyōgo Prefecture
Japanese baseball players
Nippon Professional Baseball pitchers
Tokyo Yakult Swallows players